Nicholas Brush is a Canadian alpine skier, sighted guide and Paralympian.

He competed as the sighted guide for Chris Williamson in the 2010 Winter Paralympics in Vancouver, British Columbia, Canada.
They became 4th in the Giant Slalom, 6th in the Slalom, 4th in the Super combined, visually impaired, and 6th in the Super-G, visually impaired. They obtained the bronze medal in the Men's Slalom, visually impaired at the 2014 Winter Paralympics in Sochi, Russia.

References

Nick Brush, Canadian Sport Centre Pacific (CSC Pacific)

Retirements create new opportunities within Canada's Para-alpine ski team, Canada Alpine Ski Alpin, May 19, 2010

Living people
Canadian male alpine skiers
Paralympic alpine skiers of Canada
Paralympic sighted guides
Alpine skiers at the 2010 Winter Paralympics
Year of birth missing (living people)
Paralympic medalists in alpine skiing
Paralympic bronze medalists for Canada
Medalists at the 2010 Winter Paralympics